The biological Reserve Carapa is located in the Department of Canindeyú, Paraguay, on the right bank of the river Paraná, and is one of the sites earmarked as 8 ecological reserve by the Itaipu, the largest dam in production in the world, located between Paraguay and Brazil. It is located at 260 km north of the Ciudad del Este. It was founded in 1984 and has 3,250 has.

Geography 

Surrounded by mountains and land with very steep slopes. The soils are the type latosol textured red clay.

Weather 

The weather is warm, humid and warm resulting in the overall situation in the sub mesotermal humid tropics. Annual precipitation of 1,300 mm. The drainage basin of the river Carapâ is composed of several tributaries that arise in different parts of the Department of Canindeyu (Paraguay).

Animals and plants 

The vegetation of the refuge is composed of associations of forest high, low forest, swamps, high camp, camp low, primitive forest  and forest near the river. The dominant species are composed of: Tabebuia, Peltophorum dubium and Cedrela fissilis.

Of the animal species recorded, most are in the range of endangered, among those mentioned: Lobo water (Lutra longicaudis), Pork Mount (collared peccary), among carnivores Felis, people are casual because it is part of its territorial displacement. Of all the species recorded in the area of Itaipu dam, 61.4% belong to the River area Carapâ.

Infrastructure and use of refuge 

The refuge has a structure in which edilicia living and working professionals and technicians on a permanent basis.

Overall objective of the refuge: 

 Study of the environmental situation in the drainage basin of river Carapâ
 Study of the mastofauna birds and fish
 Study of the environmental situation in the drainage basin of river Carapâ
 Study of the mastofauna birds and fish
 Studying the formation floristic
 Study of physical and chemical conditions of water
 Study of climatic conditions
 Studies soil
 Social aspects
 Analysis and classification of the ecosystem for its operating framework within a category conservationist

Itaipu Lake 

This reserve, bordering Lake is artificially created by Itaipu. Being formed in 1982, a series of economic alternatives that are already beginning to be exploited by the 77 neighboring municipalities. The artificial lake is one of the largest in the world, with 29 million m³ and 200 km extension in a straight line. Considering the bays, inlets and length reaches 1,400 km.

The formation of the lake has not only changed the look of the geographic region. The agriculture, regional economic base, begins to cede place to tourism. Several artificial beaches were created along the banks of the lake, where he practiced all sorts of water sports.

Area subdivision

According to latest techniques of management of protected areas, this refuge is divided into distinct zones in order to handle them properly.

Areas of special use: areas include reduced in size and which are essential for the administration, office accommodation, restaurant, aviation runway, and so on
Zone extensive use: areas to which visitors access for education and recreation (and self-guided interpretive trails, paths "cross country", etc.)
Zones intensive: consist of areas with outstanding scenery and that lend themselves to relatively dense recreational activities (camping areas, visitors' centers and scenic lookouts) 
Buffer Zones and Recovery: areas that have been severely damaged and it is mostly to areas adjacent to the surrounding populations
Zone Core: natural areas that have received the minimum of disruption caused by man (with three distinct nuclei and characteristic of the place)

The reserve has a panoramic viewpoint, which can be seen most of the wooded area, as well as the vast body of water formed by the dam. The combined resources of vegetation, topography and water give it a priceless value.

References 

 Che Retá Paraguay

External links
 Itaipu Binacional
 Itaipu Binacional

Tourism in Paraguay
Protected areas of Paraguay
Canindeyú Department